The Elliott River is a river in the Wide Bay–Burnett region of Queensland, Australia.

The river crosses the Goodwood Road passing through the suburb of Elliot and entering the Elliott River Fish Habitat Area and then discharging in the Coral Sea near Elliott Heads. The river descends  over its  course.

The river was named in honour of Gilbert Eliott, a public servant and politician who served as Speaker of the Legislative Assembly of Queensland between  1860 and 1870, and was Member for Wide Bay during the same term. The spelling of the river has been changed to double "l" over time.

See also

References

Rivers of Queensland
Wide Bay–Burnett